The boys' tournament in volleyball at the 2015 European Youth Summer Olympic Festival in Tbilisi, Georgia was the event in a European Youth Summer Olympic Festival. It was held at New Volleyball Arena from 27 July to 1 August 2015.

Final round

Semifinals 

|}

Third Place 

|}

Final 

|}

Final standings

Medalists

See also 
 Volleyball at the 2015 European Youth Summer Olympic Festival – Girls' tournament

External links 
 2015 European Youth Summer Olympic Festival official site
 European Youth Summer Olympic Festival results

Boys'